Somnambulista is the second album by Brazzaville, released in 2001.

Critical reception
AllMusic wrote that "while the music is reassuring and enveloping like the lapping waves of a tropical beach, listen closely to the lyrics lying just under the surface of the saxophone-led music and you hear sad, if poetic, tales of broken lives." Exclaim! thought that "as the album progresses, we phase in and out of hazy vibes, jazzy licks and pop tinged varieties with a fluidity that is practically shocking."

Track listing

 "Air Mail"
 "Foreign Disaster Days"
 "Sandman"
 "Boeing"
 "Casa Batllo"
 "Lazy, Flawed and Hopeless"
 "Jane"
 "Super Gizi"
 "4 Am Osaka"
 "Old Man Dub"
 "3rd and Broadway"

References

 

Brazzaville (American band) albums
2001 albums